Libis Andrés Arenas Murillo (born 12 May 1987) is a Colombian football (soccer) goalkeeper.

He started his career with Envigado Fútbol Club. S.S. Lazio then made a deal to buy him, but did not include him in the first team in order not to fill a non-EU spot in the squad. He was on loan to Envigado in January 2007. He had also been on trial to Sporting Clube de Portugal in early 2007.

He was sold to Mérida UD and loaned to Central Español.

He is the third Colombian 2005 U-20 World Cup player following Abel Aguilar and Cristián Zapata to be signed by an Italian club.

Titles

References

1987 births
Living people
Association football goalkeepers
Colombian footballers
Colombia under-20 international footballers
Colombia international footballers
Envigado F.C. players
Central Español players
Sportivo Luqueño players
Deportivo Pereira footballers
Patriotas Boyacá footballers
Villa Teresa players
Peñarol players
América de Cali footballers
Independiente Santa Fe footballers
Fortaleza C.E.I.F. footballers
Categoría Primera A players
Categoría Primera B players
Uruguayan Primera División players
Colombian expatriate footballers
Colombian expatriate sportspeople in Spain
Expatriate footballers in Italy
Expatriate footballers in Spain
Expatriate footballers in Paraguay
Expatriate footballers in Uruguay
Colombian expatriate sportspeople in Italy
Sportspeople from Chocó Department